Brussels-Luxembourg railway station, officially Brussels-Luxembourg, is a railway station in the European Quarter of Brussels, under the Esplanade of the European Parliament (part of the European Parliament complex).

History

The station was built between 1854 and 1855 by the Grande Compagnie de Luxembourg, as part of the Brussels-Luxembourg railway line it was constructing. It was to service the new Leopold Quarter, hence its original name of Leopold Quarter railway station. The lead architect was Gustave Saintenoy, who designed it in a neoclassical style, in keeping with the other buildings around the Place du Luxembourg/Luxemburgplein, which were built around the same time.

The station was Brussels' third, after / railway station near the site of today's Yser/IJzer metro station, north of the City of Brussels, and Bogards' railway station near the Place Rouppe/Rouppeplein in the southern part of the city (which would eventually become Brussels-North railway station and Brussels-South railway station, respectively). Unlike those two, however, Leopold Quarter railway station was designed as a transit station rather than a terminal one. It was painted by the French artist Henri Ottmann in The Luxembourg Station in Brussels (1903).

During the 19th century, the station was divided into sections to differentiate the three different classes of travel. The station was extended in 1899 and 1921 with single storey pavilions, which were then amalgamated in 1934, when the facade was standardised.

Reconstruction
Prior to its reconstruction in the 1990s and 2000s, the station was ground level with its front building facing the Place du Luxembourg. It was redesigned as a subsurface-track station to make way for the European Parliament and a pedestrian link between the Place du Luxembourg and Leopold Park. The tracks were covered over and moved underground during the 1990s. The station's old building was partly demolished in 2004, with the central entrance building being incorporated into the Parliament's complex as an information office until 2016. Today, the central entrance has been repurposed as "Station Europe", a welcome point of the European Parliament. There, visitors can find many gadgets, such as an impressive augmented reality model of the complex, offering information on the Parliament, its buildings, its history and the famous personalities who came to visit. The entrance to the station is now a few metres to the south, via stairs descending down from the esplanade or via a ground floor entrance through the Parliament's József Antall building on the /.

The station, completed in 2009, is now entirely underground, although it has been designed to allow a maximum of natural light in. Stained glass windows from the original structure were incorporated into the new building. The same architects consortium responsible for the Parliament, Atelier Espace Léopold, were also in charge of the station's redesign.

Future
According to its 2004 planning document, the Brussels Intercommunal Transport Company (STIB/MIVB) has long term plans to open a metro stop at the station. There is congestion along the main metro route running through the European Quarter, and there are too many transfers being made at Arts-Loi/Kunst-Wet. To relieve this, a branch would be directed from Merode to Trône/Troon, via Brussels-Luxembourg. There may be a further metro line running south-west from the station to serve Ixelles, the Chaussée de Waterloo/Waterloosesteenweg, and Vanderkindere. This would make the station one of the major transfer points of the Brussels Metro system. The plan also hopes to make the city's railway stations more inter-connected, allowing for easier transfers between Brussels-South, Brussels-Schuman, and Brussels-Luxembourg.

Train services

The station is served by the following service(s):

Intercity services (IC-16) Brussels - Namur - Arlon - Luxembourg
Intercity services (IC-17) Brussels Airport - Brussels-Luxembourg - Namur - Dinant (weekdays)
Intercity services (IC-17) Brussels - Namur - Dinant (weekends)
Intercity services (IC-18) Brussels - Namur - Liege (weekdays)
Intercity services (IC-27) Brussels Airport - Brussels-Luxembourg - Nivelles - Charleroi (weekdays)
Brussels GEN/RER services (S4) Aalst - Denderleeuw - Brussels-Luxembourg (- Etterbeek - Merode - Vilvoorde) (weekdays)
Brussels GEN/RER services (S5) Mechelen - Brussels-Luxembourg - Etterbeek - Halle - Enghien (- Geraardsbergen) (weekdays)
Brussels GEN/RER services (S8) Brussels - Etterbeek - Ottignies - Louvain-la-Neuve
Brussels GEN/RER services (S9) Leuven - Brussels-Luxembourg - Etterbeek - Braine-l'Alleud (weekdays, peak hours only)
Brussels GEN/RER services (S81) Schaarbeek - Brussels-Luxembourg - Etterbeek - Ottignies (weekdays, peak hours only)

See also

 List of railway stations in Belgium
 Rail transport in Belgium
 Transport in Brussels
 History of Brussels

References

Notes

Bibliography

External links

 information at belrail.be

Railway stations in Brussels
European quarter of Brussels
Ixelles
Railway stations located underground in Belgium
Railway stations opened in 1854